Henry II of Brabant (1207 – February 1, 1248) was Duke of Brabant and Lothier after the death of his father Henry I in 1235. His mother was Matilda of Boulogne.  

Henry II supported his sister Mathilde's son, William II of Holland, in the his bid for election as king of Germany.

His first marriage was to Marie of Hohenstaufen (April 3, 1207–1235, Leuven), daughter of Philip of Swabia and Irene Angelina. They had six children:
 Henry III, Duke of Brabant (d. 1261)
 Philip, died young
 Matilda of Brabant (1224 – September 29, 1288), married:
 Robert I of Artois, 14 June 1237, in Compiègne
 before May 31, 1254 to Guy II of Châtillon, Count of Saint Pol.
 Beatrix (1225 – November 11, 1288), married:
 at Creuzburg March 10, 1241, Heinrich Raspe, Landgrave of Thuringia;
 in Leuven November 1247 to William III of Dampierre, Count of Flanders (1224 – June 6, 1251).
 Maria of Brabant (c. 1226 – January 18, 1256, Donauwörth), married Louis II, Duke of Upper Bavaria. She was beheaded by her husband on suspicion of infidelity.
 Margaret (d. March 14, 1277), Abbess of Valduc Abbey (Hertogendal).

His second marriage was to Sophie of Thuringia (March 20, 1224 – May 29, 1275), daughter of Ludwig IV of Thuringia and Saint Elisabeth of Hungary by whom he had two children:
 Henry (1244–1308), created Landgrave of Hesse in 1264.
 Elizabeth (1243 – October 9, 1261), married Albert I, Duke of Brunswick-Lüneburg

Henry died in Leuven, aged about 40.

References

Sources

See also
 Dukes of Brabant family tree

1207 births
1248 deaths
Dukes of Brabant
House of Reginar